is a Japanese manga magazine published by Mag Garden. It was first published on September 1, 2014, replacing the defunct Comic Blade.

Series
Amadeus Code
Amber Days and Golden Nights (ongoing)
The Ancient Magus' Bride (ongoing)
Chichi Kogusa
Dora Kuma
The Girl From the Other Side: Siúil, a Rún
Grisaia no Kajitsu ~L'oiseau bleu~
The Kingdoms of Ruin (ongoing)
Kitsune to Tanuki to Iinazuke (ongoing)
Kohaku no Yume de Yoimashō (Kei Sugimura, Nodoka Yoda, Masoho Murano) (ongoing)
Kuroa Chimera (Kairi Sorano)
Laughing Under the Clouds (Kemuri Karakara)
M3 the dark metal
Mars Red 
Night of the Living Cat 
Peacemaker Kurogane (Nanae Chrono) (ongoing)
Princess Lucia
Psycho-Pass: Kanshikan Shinya Kogami
Psycho-Pass 2
Rain
Rengoku ni Warau (Kemuri Karakara)
The Rolling Girls
Shiina-kun no Torikemo Hyakka
Shūten unknown (Shiho Sugiura)
Sketchbook 
Shimoneta to Iu Gainen ga Sonzai Shinai Taikutsu na Sekai: Manmaruhen (manga-hen)

See also
List of manga magazines

References

External links
 

2014 establishments in Japan
Monthly manga magazines published in Japan
Mag Garden magazines
Magazines established in 2014